Paolo Rocco Gualtieri (born 1 February 1961) is an Italian prelate of the Catholic Church who works in the diplomatic service of the Holy See.

Biography
Paolo Rocco Gualtieri was born on 1 February 1961 in Supersano, Province of Lecce, Italy. He was ordained a priest for the Diocese of Ugento-Santa Maria di Leuca on 24 September 1988.

On 13 April 2015, Pope Francis appointed him titular archbishop of Sagone and Apostolic Nuncio to Madagascar. He received his episcopal consecration from Cardinal Pietro Parolin on May 30.

Pope Francis added to his responsibilities in the course of the year, naming him Apostolic Nuncio to the Seychelles on 26 September, Apostolic Nuncio to Mauritius on 24 October, and Apostolic Delegate to the Comoros with similar responsibility for Réunion as well on 13 November.

On 6 August 2022, Pope Francis appointed him as Apostolic Nuncio to Peru.

See also
 List of heads of the diplomatic missions of the Holy See

References

External links
Catholic Hierarchy: Archbishop Paolo Rocco Gualtieri 

Apostolic Nuncios to Madagascar
Apostolic Nuncios to Seychelles
Apostolic Nuncios to Mauritius
People from Apulia
1961 births
Living people